Patrick Roth (born June 25, 1953 in Freiburg/Breisgau) is a German writer. He moved to the USA in his early twenties and lived there for many years. The author of more than a dozen books, he has won a number of literary prizes including the Rauris Literature Prize, the Hugo-Ball-Preis and the Literaturpreis der Konrad-Adenauer-Stiftung. His book Starlite Terrace was translated into English by Krishna Winston.

Books

References

External links 

German male writers
1953 births
Living people